Live Letters is a live DVD by the Finnish rock band The Rasmus, originally released on 22 November 2004 on Playground Music.

The DVD features eleven live videos from a performance at Gampel Open Air in Switzerland on 21 August 2004, which was part of their Dead Letters tour. All of the songs performed are taken from the Hell Of A Tester, Into and Dead Letters albums. The DVD contains also all seven music videos from Dead Letters, including the three different versions of "In the Shadows" .

The DVD also features bonus material, including behind the scenes footage and interviews, as well a hidden video clip. The hidden video can be accessed by going to the "Music videos" menu, selecting the second version of "In The Shadows", and then pressing the right arrow, causing The Rasmus' logo to appear on the right. Selecting this will play the video.

On 20 February 2007, Live Letters was released in the United States by the record label DRT Entertainment. There is no difference in content between this and the European release.

The DVD was produced by Baranga Film, who have also produced of the band's music videos from Dead Letters, including "In My Life", "In the Shadows" (European version) and "Funeral Song".

Personnel
 Lauri Ylönen – vocals
 Eero Heinonen – bass, backing vocals
 Pauli Rantasalmi – guitar
 Aki Hakala – drums

Track listing
Live at Gampel Open Air
"First Day of My Life"
"Guilty"
"F-F-F-Falling"
"Still Standing"
"Time to Burn"
"Bullet"
"Every Day"
"One & Only"
"In the Shadows"
"Funeral Song"
"In My Life"

Music videos
"In the Shadows" (1st Finnish 'Bandit' version) – 2003
"In the Shadows" (2nd European 'Crow' version) – 2003
"In the Shadows" (3rd U.S./UK 'Mirror' version) – 2004
"In My Life" – 2003
"First Day of My Life" – 2003
"Funeral Song (The Resurrection)" – 2004
"Guilty" – 2004

Extras
 Four video documentaries
 Photos
 Storyboards
 An interview
 Making of the videos
 A hidden clip from the first studio shot of "In the Shadows"

See also
 Dead Letters, the band's fifth studio album.

External links
 The Rasmus' official website
 Live Letters on Playground Music
 Download Live Letters flash cards
 Live Letters fan review

The Rasmus
2004 films
2000s English-language films